The National Union from Banat (UNB) was a regionalist political party in Romania, led by Avram Imbroane.

History
In the 1919 elections it won four seats in the Chamber of Deputies. However, it did not contest any further elections.

Electoral history

Legislative elections

References

 

History of Banat
Nationalist parties in Romania
Regionalist parties in Romania
Defunct political parties in Romania